The Sigma 12-24mm f/4.5-5.6 EX DG HSM is a professional-level wide-angle zoom lens made by Sigma Corporation. At launch it was the widest rectilinear lens available for full-frame 35mm SLR cameras, providing a field of view of 122 degrees. It has since been surpassed by the Canon EF 11-24mm f/4L zoom lens and the Irix 11mm f/4, a manual focus prime lens. The Sigma 12-24 has low distortion even compared to less wide zooms like the Canon EF 16-35mm lens.

This lens is available in Canon, Nikon, and Sigma, Pentax, and Sony mounts.  HSM focusing is available only in the Canon, Nikon, and Sigma variants.  The build quality is typical of Sigma EX lenses, with a painted metal lens barrel and damped focus and zoom rings.  As expected for a lens of these specifications, there is a bulbous front element.

See also
List of Nikon compatible lenses with integrated autofocus-motor

References

External links

012-024mm f 4.5-5.6 EX DG HSM
Camera lenses introduced in 2003